The 2012 F2000 Championship Series season marked the seventh season of competition in the series. It consisted of 14 rounds (seven double-race weekends), beginning April 12 at Virginia International Raceway and concluding October 14 at Watkins Glen International.

Venezuelan Roberto La Rocca of HP-Tech won 11 of the 14 races and finished on the podium in 13 of the 14. American Wyatt Gooden, who got his start through winning online video racing tournaments, finished second in points with two wins. American Niki Coello won one race and finished third. Kevin Kopp finished fourth in points and Tim Minor finished fifth, while claiming his second consecutive and third overall Masters Championship title.

Race calendar and results

Championship standings

This list only contains drivers who registered for the championship.
(M) indicates driver is participating in Masters Class for drivers over 40 years of age.

1 Roberto La Rocca was penalized 25 points for failing to leave sufficient racing room for a competitor in Round 2.

References

External links
 Official Series Website

F2000
F2000 Championship Series seasons